The Center for Media, Data and Society (CMDS) (now closed) was a global research center at Central European University (CEU) that focused on media, communication and information policy. Located in Budapest, Hungary, CMDS produced scholarly and practice-oriented research about journalism, media freedom, and internet policy. In October 2022, CMDS began its operations under the name Media and Journalism Research Center (MJRC) independently of CEU.

History and Network 

The center was founded as the Center for Media and Communication Studies. It began in 2004, and was designed to serve as a focal point an international network of acclaimed scholars and academic institutions, whose research ranges from media and communications policy, fundamental communications rights through media and civil society and new media and digital technology to media in transition. In September 2014 it was relaunched as the Center for Media, Data and Society to represent new interests in technology policy, and big data. The center was led between September 2016 until it shut down by Marius Dragomir, a media expert, journalist and scholar. Most of CMDS' projects are continued by the Media and Journalism Research Center, a research institute established by Marius Dragomir in 2022.

Projects and Mission
The center's research projects focused on identifying trends and challenges in the use of information technologies and advancing policy discussions about the regulation of data and media. The center had an annual summer school on activism and digital media that draws democracy advocates, media activists, and civil rights campaigners from around the world to discuss policy and strategy. Projects of CMDS included Creative Approaches to Living Cultural Archives, Ranking Digital Rights, Strengthening Journalism in Europe, Research on Violent Online Political Extremism.

The center was also known for its monitoring work on media policy in Central and Eastern Europe and Hungary in particular. Since its launch in 2017, the Media Influence Matrix project designed by Marius Dragomir expanded to over 50 countries. The center is also known for its research on media capture. Its last director, Marius Dragomir published studies that attempted to define and analyze the media capture phenomenon.

See also
Berkman Center for Internet & Society
Center for Global Communication Studies at Annenberg School for Communication at the University of Pennsylvania
Oxford Internet Institute
Program in Comparative Media Law at University of Oxford

References

External links
 Center for Media, Data and Society homepage (archived)

Research
Central European University
Information society
Internet-related activism
Internet governance advocacy groups
2004 establishments in Hungary